National Backward Krushi Vidyapeet Solapur  is a public college in Solapur, Maharashtra state, India.  

Established in 2014, the college provides programs in agriculture education, research, and resources.

References  
National Agriculture Education Institute of Research & Resources

External links 
 

Agricultural universities and colleges in Maharashtra
Education in Solapur
Educational institutions established in 2014
2014 establishments in Maharashtra